A precipitation shaft is a weather phenomenon, visible from the ground at large distances from the storm system, as a dark vertical shaft of heavy rain, hail, or snow, generally localized over a relatively small area.

This is different from a virga, which is a shaft of precipitation that evaporates before reaching the ground.

Formation

A precipitation shaft is mostly found underneath convective clouds, like cumulonimbus cloud or cumulus congestus cloud during a downpour storm, as these have well defined vertical drafts (updrafts and downdrafts) needed for heavy precipitation. However, an advancing nimbostratus cloud could have a diffuse precipitation leading edge, so its shaft may be unclear.

Developing rain shafts often have a fuzzy, bulbous appearance as they descend. If a source of dry air is present at higher altitude and the air into which the rain is falling is sufficiently warm, then strong, and possibly damaging microbursts are possible as sinking air forms.

See also

 Downburst
 Virga
 Shower

References

Precipitation